Maryam Zakaria is an Iranian-born Swedish actress and model who works in Indian films. She has appeared in Hindi, Telugu, and Tamil language films. She is best known for her work in films such as Madatha Kaja, Agent Vinod and Grand Masti.

Career
In Sweden, Zakaria worked as model, dance teacher, choreographer, and established a Bollywood dance school, the Indisk Dans Studio, which was the first dance school in Sweden to teach the "jhatkas and matkas of Bollywood cinema". She moved to Mumbai, India, in 2009 to work in Bollywood and began working as a model, appearing in various television adverts, the most notable being the adverts of Set Wet, Layz, and Coke. She also appeared in a Coca-Cola advertisement with Imran Khan.

Tamil film director Sundar C. signed her to perform an item number in his film Nagaram (2010), after watching a dance video of hers on YouTube. Her performance in the hit number "Diyalo Diyala" from 100% Love was her big breakthrough. She went on to play one of the female lead characters in another Telugu film, Madatha Kaja (2011), alongside Allari Naresh, and signed to do another Telugu movie as leading actress in Arjuna. In 2012, she appeared in the item number "Dilli Ki Billi" in Muazzam Beg's film Sadda Adda.

In the Saif Ali Khan film Agent Vinod, she acted as Farah and performed a mujra in the song "Dil Mera Muft Ka" alongside Kareena Kapoor, which gave her a fame in Bollywood. In 2012, she signed for Indra Kumar's movie Grand Masti, as leading actress opposite Aftab Shivdasani, which released on 13 September 2013. Grand Masti is the highest grossing Bollywood film with an A (Adults Only) certificate in India to be a big hit, subsequently entering Bollywood's 100-crore club in India. The film was declared a Super Hit in India by Box Office India.

Personal life 
Maryam Zakaria married choreographer Arvind Thakur in 2012. The couple also had a son, Aryan Thakur, in 2013.

Filmography

References

External links

 
 

Living people
1984 births
Actresses from Tehran
Iranian film actresses
Iranian female models
Iranian women dancers
Iranian emigrants to Sweden
Swedish people of Iranian descent
Swedish film actresses
Swedish female models
Iranian expatriates in India
Swedish expatriates in India
Actresses in Hindi cinema
Actresses in Tamil cinema
Actresses in Telugu cinema
European actresses in India
Actresses of European descent in Indian films
Iranian former Muslims
Converts to Hinduism from Islam
Iranian Hindus
Swedish Hindus